Judge Wallace may refer to:

J. Clifford Wallace (born 1928), judge of the United States Court of Appeals for the Ninth Circuit
William James Wallace (1837–1917), judge of the United States Court of Appeals for the Second Circuit
William Robert Wallace (1886–1960), judge of the United States District Court for the Eastern District of Oklahoma

See also
Justice Wallace (disambiguation)